Clifford Barton "Tippi" Gray (January 29, 1892 – April 1968) was an American bobsledder, songwriter and actor, who competed in the late 1920s and 1930s. He won two medals at the Winter Olympics, a gold in the four-man event at Lake Placid, New York in 1932 and a gold in the five-man event at St. Moritz, Switzerland, in 1928, as well as a bronze in the four-man event at the 1937 FIBT World Championships in St. Moritz.

Gray was born in Chicago, Illinois, to an English father and American mother. He was a nephew of General Henry T. Allen. He was educated at Lake Forest Academy and then Cornell University. In his early years he was a musical theatre and film actor, appearing with Lew Fields and stock companies in Chicago, and in films by Pathé, Famous Players and World. He lived Ohio, then New York, and visited St. Moritz, where he was recruited to the US bobsled team. For many years, it was believed that Gray was the same person as Clifford Grey, an English songwriter, librettist and actor. He later moved to Paris and wrote jazz tunes for the revue at the Moulin Rouge.

Gray was known as a playboy and world-traveling socialite, chronicled often by columnist O. O. McIntyre, who called him "the most consistent of international gadabouts–as homeless as smoke and always adrift." Screenwriter Tom J. Geraghty called him "mysterious as the wind... absolutely omnipresent and ubiquitous." Charlie Chaplin described him in his autobiography: "He would appear at Hollywood parties, a negative, easygoing type with a perpetual vacuous grin". In 1929 Gray married Clara Louise Cassidy, daughter of millionaire United Cigar Stores founder Charles A. Whelan. They were divorced by 1937, McIntyre calling him a "plump bachelor". In 1939, his then fiancé Ruby Pennington was hospitalized with a fractured skull while traveling to New York to marry him.

He died in 1968 near San Diego, California.

Notes

 
 Wallenchinsky, David. (1984). "Bobsled: Four-Man". In The Complete Book of the Olympics: 1896-1980. New York: Penguin Books. p. 560.

External links
 Bobsleigh five-man Olympic medalists for 1928
 DatabaseOlympics.com profile

1892 births
1969 deaths
American male bobsledders
Bobsledders at the 1928 Winter Olympics
Bobsledders at the 1932 Winter Olympics
Olympic gold medalists for the United States in bobsleigh
Olympic silver medalists for the United States in bobsleigh
Medalists at the 1928 Winter Olympics
Medalists at the 1932 Winter Olympics
American male silent film actors
20th-century American male actors
Male actors from Chicago
Sportspeople from Chicago